The Journals Division of the University of Chicago Press, in partnership with 27 learned and professional societies and associations, foundations, museums, and other not-for-profit organizations, currently publishes and distributes 81 peer-reviewed academic journal titles. These influential scholarly publications present original research in the social sciences, the humanities, education, and the biological, medical, and physical sciences. The following list includes the journals currently published by the University of Chicago Press.

Art and art history 
 Afterall: A Journal of Art, Context, and Enquiry
 American Art
 Archives of American Art Journal
 Art Documentation
 Bulletin of the Detroit Institute of Arts (2019)
 Gesta
 Getty Research Journal
 Journal of the Warburg and Courtauld Institutes
 Metropolitan Museum Journal
 Portable Gray (2019)
 Res: Anthropology and Aesthetics
 Source: Notes in the History of Art
 Speculum
 I Tatti Studies in the Italian Renaissance
 West 86th
 Winterthur Portfolio

Biological, physical, and medical sciences 
 The American Naturalist
 The Biological Bulletin
 Freshwater Science
 International Journal of Plant Sciences
 The Journal of Geology
 Physiological and Biochemical Zoology
 The Quarterly Review of Biology

Economics 
 American Journal of Health Economics
 Economic Development and Cultural Change
 Entrepreneurship and Innovation Policy and the Economy
 Environmental and Energy Policy and the Economy
 Innovation Policy and the Economy
 Journal of the Association of Environmental and Research Economists
 Journal of Human Capital
 Journal of Labor Economics
 The Journal of Law and Economics
 Journal of Political Economy
 Marine Resource Economics
 National Tax Journal
 NBER Macroeconomics Annual
 NBER Seminar on Macroeconomics
 Review of Environmental Economics and Policy
 Supreme Court Economic Review
 Tax Policy and the Economy

Education 
 American Journal of Education
 Comparative Education Review
 Elementary School Journal
 Schools: Studies in Education

History 
 American Journal of Archaeology
 American Political Thought
 The British Journal for the Philosophy of Science
 Bulletin of the American Society of Overseas Research
 Critical Historical Studies
 Environmental History
 History of Humanities
 History of Religions
 HOPOS: The Journal of the International Society for the History of Philosophy of Science
 Isis
 The Journal of African American History
 Journal of Anthropological Research
 Journal of Cuneiform Studies
 The Journal of Modern History
 Journal of Near Eastern Studies
 Journal of the Warburg and Courtauld Institutes
 KNOW: A Journal on the Formation of Knowledge
 Near Eastern Archaeology
 Osiris
 Res: Anthropology and Aesthetics
 The Social History of Alcohol and Drugs: An Interdisciplinary Journal
 Source: Notes in the History of Art
 The Wordsworth Circle

Humanities 
 Classical Philology 
 Critical Historical Studies
 Critical Inquiry
 English Literary Renaissance
 Ethics
 HAU: Journal of Ethnographic Theory
 History of Humanities
 History of Religions
 HOPOS: The Journal of the International Society for the History of Philosophy of Science
 International Journal of American Linguistics
 Isis
 The Journal of Religion
 KNOW: A Journal on the Formation of Knowledge
 The Library Quarterly
 Modern Philology
 Osiris
 Papers of the Bibliographical Society of America
 Philosophy of Science
 Renaissance Drama
 Renaissance Quarterly
 Signs and Society
 Signs: Journal of Women in Culture and Society
 Speculum
 Spenser Studies: A Renaissance Poetry Annual (2018)
 The Wordsworth Circle (2019)

Law and Politics 
 American Political Thought
 Crime and Justice
 Journal of Law and Courts
 The Journal of Law and Economics
 The Journal of Legal Studies
 The Journal of Politics
 Polity
 Social Service Review
 Supreme Court Economic Review
 The Supreme Court Review

Science 
 The American Naturalist
 The Biological Bulletin
 Freshwater Science
 International Journal of Plant Sciences
 The Journal of Geology
 Physiological and Biochemical Zoology
 The Quarterly Review of Biology

Social sciences 
 American Journal of Sociology
 American Political Thought
 Bulletin of the American Schools of Oriental Research (2019)
 The China Journal
 Crime and Justice
 Current Anthropology
 The Journal of Cuneiform Studies (2019)
 HAU: Journal of Ethnographic Theory (2018)
 The Journal of African American History (2018)
 Journal of Anthropological Research
 Journal of the Association for Consumer Research
 The Journal of Modern History
 Near Eastern Archaeology (2019)
 Journal of Near Eastern Studies
 The Journal of Politics
 Polity (journal)
 Journal of the Society of Social Work and Research
 The Social History of Alcohol and Drugs: An Interdisciplinary Journal (2019)
 Social Service Review

See also 
 University of Chicago Press
 Association of University Presses

External links 
 University of Chicago Press Journals Division

 
University of Chicago Press
University of Chicago Press journals